Lime plaster is a type of plaster composed of sand, water, and lime, usually non-hydraulic hydrated lime (also known as slaked lime, high calcium lime or air lime). Ancient lime plaster often contained horse hair for reinforcement and pozzolan additives to reduce the working time.

Traditional non-hydraulic hydrated lime only sets through carbonatation when the plaster is kept moist and access of CO2 from the air is possible. It will not set when submersed in water. When a very thick layer or several layers are applied, the lime can remain soft for weeks.

The curing time of lime plaster can be shortened by using (natural) hydraulic lime or adding pozzolan additives, transforming it into artificially hydraulic lime. In ancient times, Roman lime plaster incorporated pozzolanic volcanic ash; in modern times, fly ash is preferred. Non-hydraulic lime plaster can also be made to set faster by adding gypsum.

Lime production for use in plastering home-made cisterns (in making them impermeable) was especially important in countries where rain-fall was scarce in summer. This enabled them to collect the winter run-off of rain water and to have it stored for later use, whether for personal or agricultural needs.

Advantages 
Lime plaster sets up to a solid mass that is durable yet flexible. Hydraulic lime plaster is not as hard as cement plaster. Hydraulic limes and historic limes were graded as feeble, moderate and eminent. Modern hydraulic limes would be graded at 2, 3.5, or 5 newtons. Portland cement plaster on the other hand would typically be in the region of 25 to 35 newtons when cured; i.e. up to 10 times harder. Lime plaster is less affected by water and will not soften or dissolve like drywall and earthen or gypsum plaster. Unlike gypsum or clay plaster, lime plaster is sufficiently durable and resistant to the elements to be used for exterior plastering.

Compared to cement plaster, plaster made from hydrated lime is less brittle and less prone to cracking, requiring no expansion joints. It will not detach from the wall when subjected to shear stress due to expansion inflicted by solar radiation and moisture. Unlike cement plaster, it will shield softer materials from shear stresses. This would otherwise possibly cause the deterioration of the underlying surface. It is usually not recommended to replace more than 20% of the lime content with cement when rendering the facade, and it is a matter of  contention whether adding any concrete is ever appropriate in order to maintain the benefits of lime over concrete. 

Lime plaster is permeable and allows for the diffusion and evaporation of moisture. However, when properly worked with pozzolanic agents and animal fat, it becomes impermeable.
 
The elevated pH of the lime in the plaster acts as a fungicide, preventing mold from growing in lime plaster.

Disadvantages 
Non-hydraulic lime plaster sets slowly and is quite caustic while wet, with a pH of 12. Plasterers must take care to protect themselves or use mild acids as vinegar or lemon juice to neutralize chemical burn. When the plaster is dry, the pH falls to about 8.6. Non-hydraulic lime plaster requires moisture to set and has to be prevented from drying for several days. The number of qualified tradesmen capable of plastering with lime has declined due to industrialization, deskilling of trade crafts, and widespread adoption of drywall and gypsum veneer plaster.

Historical use in the arts 
One of the earliest examples of lime plaster dates back to the end of the eighth millennium BC. Three statues were discovered in a buried pit at 'Ain Ghazal in Jordan that were sculpted with lime plaster over armatures of reeds and twine.  They were made in the pre-pottery neolithic period, around 7200 BC. The fact that these sculptures have lasted so long is a testament to the durability of lime plaster.

Historical uses in building 
 Lime plaster was a common multi-purpose material used throughout the PPNB Levant, Iran and Anatolia, including Jericho, 'Ain Ghazal, Çatalhöyük and Çayönü. It was used for internal walls, floors and internal platforms. At the archaeological site of 'Ain Ghazal in modern-day Jordan, occupied from 7200 BC to 5000 BC, lime plaster is believed to have been used as the main component of the large anthropomorphical figurines discovered there in the 1980s.
 Qadad lime plaster is waterproof and used for interiors and exteriors
 Some of the earliest known examples of lime used for building purposes are in ancient Egyptian buildings (primarily monuments). Some of these edifices are found in the chambers of the pyramids, and date to between the Ninth and Tenth Dynasties (~2000 BC). They are still hard and intact.
 Archaeological digs carried out on the island of Malta have shown that in places like Tarxien and Hagar, lime stucco was also used as a binder to hold stone together as well as for decoration at sites dating back as far as 3000–2500 BC.
 At el-Amarna, a large pavement on brick was discovered that dates back to 1400 BC. It was apparently the floor of part of the harem of King Amenhotep IV.
 Ancient Chinese used Suk-wui (the Chinese word for slaked lime) in the construction of The Great Wall of China.
 Ancient Romans used hydraulic lime (added volcanic ash, an activated aluminium silicate) to ensure hardening of plaster and concrete in cold or wet conditions.
 The Aztec Empire and other Mesoamerican civilizations used lime plaster to pave streets in their cities. It was also used to coat the walls and floors of buildings.
 This material was used in the San Luis Mission architecture.

See also 
 'Ain Ghazal
 Faux Finishing
 Fresco, a method of painting on fresh plaster
 Gypsum
 Lime (material)
 Lime mortar
 Limepit
 Limestone
 Plaster
 Plaster of Paris
 Plasterwork
 Qadad, a waterproofing method for lime plaster
 Tadelakt, a waterproofing method for lime plaster
 Sarooj
 Whitewash

References

Further reading
 Cedar Rose Guelberth and Dan Chiras, The Natural Plaster Book: earth, lime and gypsum plasters for natural homes'' J.N. Tubb, Canaanites, London, The British Museum Press, 1998
 Stafford Holmes, Michael Wingate, Building With Lime: A Practical Introduction'', Intermediate Technology Publications Ltd,

Lancaster Limeworks Learning Center

External links
 British Museum: Lime Plaster Statues
 

 

Building materials
Plastering
Pre-Pottery Neolithic B